Filthy! is Papa John Creach's second solo album and the first with his band Zulu. The guitarist of Zulu would later be known as Keb' Mo'. The band Hot Tuna also makes an appearance on the album on the track "Walking the Tou Tou", which was written by Jorma Kaukonen.

Track listing

Side One
"Filthy Funky" (Miles Grayson) – 5:19
"No More Country Girls" (Grayson, Lermon Horton) – 3:42
"Don't Tell It To No One" (Papa John Creach) – 2:20
"Mother's Day" (Roger Spotts) – 3:16
"Walking the Tou Tou" (Jorma Kaukonen) – 3:16

Side Two
"Everybody Wants My Good Thing" (Grayson, Horton) – 4:12
"Far Out" (Spotts) – 3:19
"Give Me an Hour in Your Garden (And I'll Show You How to Plant a Rose)" (Grayson, Horton) – 5:30
"Time Out for Sex" (Spotts) – 2:59
"Up in the Alley" (Creach) – 3:30

Personnel
 Papa John Creach – electric violin, vocals
 Big Joe Turner – vocals on "Give Me an Hour in Your Garden"
 Harmonica Fats (pseudonym for Harvey Blackston; 1927–2000) – harmonica on "No More Country Girls"

Zulu
Plays on all tracks except "Walking the Tou Tou"
Carl Byrd – drums
Kevin Moore – guitar
Johnny Parker – keyboards
Holden "Hoagy" Raphael – percussion, Jew's harp
Sam Williams – bass

Hot Tuna
Plays on "Walking the Tou Tou"
Jack Casady – bass
Jorma Kaukonen – lead guitar
Sammy Piazza – drums
Hoagy Raphael – congas

Horn Section
Blue Mitchell – trumpet
Henry Coker, John Ewing – trombones
Joe Lane Davis, Jerry Jumonville, Maurice Simon – tenor saxophones

Background Vocals
Venetta Fields, Sherlie Matthews, Marti McCall, Luther Waters, Oren Waters, Maxine Willard

Production
Papa John Creach – producer, arranger
Miles Grayson – arranger
Roger Hamilton Spotts – arranger
Jamie Dee Howell – production assistance
Chick Casady – wizard
Kerry McNabb – recording engineer, mixdown engineer
Recorded at Paramount Recording Studio
Marshall Brevetz – studio supervisor
Mastered at United Sound, Burbank
Pat (Maurice) Ieraci – production coordinator
Bruce Steinberg – photography, design
Bill Thompson – manager, poetry

Notes

Papa John Creach albums
Filthy!
Grunt Records albums